Portobello West fashion and art market is a seasonal market held in Vancouver, BC, Canada. The Market is a regular event from March to December at which local designers and artisans can sell their creations directly to the public. 
It was established in August 2006 by Carlie Smith, a graduate of Royal Roads University who, after living in London, England for two years, wanted to bring the European style market atmosphere to her home town. Carlie envisioned a regular event that would raise the profile of local designers and artisans as well as be a regular community event.

Location 
Originally held at the Plaza of Nations, Portobello West relocated to the Rocky Mountaineer Station in November 2006 as a result of the Plaza's closure. It currently takes place at Creekside Community Centre (1 Athlete's Way, Vancouver) in the Olympic Village/False Creek area.

Data 
The inaugural market was attended by some 3,000 shoppers and had 92 vendors selling local fashion and art products. Since then the average attendance has been 1,100 shoppers and 120 vendors (not including food and drink vendors).

In November 2006, the Market suffered a drop in attendance as a result of a last minute change of location from the Plaza of Nations to the Rocky Mountaineer Station and a sudden snowfall on the market day. The attendance improved again for the first ever Holiday Market on the second Sunday of December 2006.

Portobello West has only ever had one January Market and one February Market, both in 2007. After consultation with local artists and designers and the general public, the January and February Markets were determined to be unpopular, predominantly as a result of the consistently inclement weather in the region during those months.

In 2008 the Market introduced a two-day season opener on the last weekend of March and a two-day Holiday Season Market on the second weekend of December, with both events drawing nearly 3,000 shoppers across both days.
 
In 2009 the Market added another two-day Market at the end of November, expanding the Holiday Season Markets to 4 days.

Portobello West has no Olympic Markets planned for February 2010.

Trivia 
The name 'Portobello West' was suggested by Carlie's father, Grant 'Fuzzy' Smith, as a reference to the famous Portobello Road market in London, England and also to the location of the new market (in Western Canada).

Commonly referred to as 'The Market' and 'Portobello'.

In 2008, Portobello West stopped using paper applications, transferring all application processes to a web-based system.

In 2009, Carlie Smith took the concept of Portobello West to Toronto, Canada and established Portobello East (renamed for its more Eastern location).

External links 
 Portobello West

Retail markets in Canada
Shops in Vancouver